Kord-e Olya (also Romanized as Kord-e ‘Olyā and Kord ‘Olya; also known as Kard-e Bālā and Kurd) is a village in Karvan-e Olya Rural District, Karvan District, Tiran and Karvan County, Isfahan Province, Iran. At the 2006 census, its population was 739, in 215 families.

References 

Populated places in Tiran and Karvan County